Ashish Goyal is a recipient of the National Award for the Empowerment of Persons with Disabilities 2010.  This is India's highest civilian award for a disabled individual, It was awarded on 3 December 2010 by President of India Pratibha Patil in New Delhi. In 2015, he was named a Young Global Leader by the World Economic Forum.

Goyal was the first blind student at Wharton Business School in Philadelphia. Here he was selected by his peers to receive the Joseph P Wharton Award.  This is given to the individual who best represents The Wharton Way of Life. He graduated Wharton in 2008, earning an MBA with honours.

"Goyal’s experience as an investor in the International Financial Markets spans nearly 15 years; his focus being Global Macro.  He uses screen-reading software to check his e-mail, read research reports and look at presentations. When he needs to read graphs, which the software cannot do, he goes through the data and tries to imagine the graph in his head."

In 2008, he started his international career at J P Morgan’s London office and is credited with the distinction of becoming the first visually impaired trader in the world. His grit and determination allowed him to break the barriers on being the first blind trader to work on Wall Street. He started on the prop trading desk at J P Morgan and spent a couple of years in their CIO office.  Since then he has managed money as a Portfolio Manager for some of the World’s leading Macro Hedge funds such as Bluecrest Capital, Citadel Investment Group and Tharo Management.

In spite of such a busy and intense career, he is also a motivational speaker and has spoken at the London Stock Exchange, The World Economic Forum at Davos, the Sohn Charity Conference and other corporate and non profit events on his life, investing, the global economy and markets.

Goyal has a strong commitment to giving back to society and helping the under privileged.  His areas of involvement span from supporting research on Vedic sciences, Ayurveda, Yoga and has raised thousands of dollars annually for charities including educating underprivileged children in India, Blindness Research and International Peace. He has served as a trustee and an advisor to many international non-profit organisations. He is also a supporter of theatre and arts.

Goyal is a big sports fan having played cricket and tennis before he lost his sight. After he moved to London he picked up blind cricket and represented the Metro London Sports Club in 2009 where his team won the UK domestic blind cricket tournament.[3][7]

Goyal was born and raised in Mumbai, India. Born with perfect vision, he has retinitis pigmentosa, which caused his vision to deteriorate from age 7; by 22 he was entirely blind. He dealt with this adversity by focusing his energies on academics. Goyal stood second in his class at Narsee Monjee Institute of Management Studies in Mumbai and also won the 2003 Dun and Bradstreet Best Student Award. He worked at ING Vysya Bank as a fixed income trader in Bangalore for three years before enrolling at Wharton in 2006.

Goyal has been featured multiple times in international and Indian newspapers and has also been interviewed many times on live television.

Citations 
Ashish Goyal (upenn.edu) 11 December 2019 (The Wharton Magazine) "The Pioneer: Ashish Goyal WGO8"

Disability Inclusion > World Economic Forum Annual Meeting > Open Forum | World Economic Forum (weforum.org)  Ashish Goyal Speech at Davos on Disability Inclusion January 2020

"Visually impaired 34-yr-old has flown a plane, is now a Young Global Leader". The Indian Express. 22 March 2015. Retrieved 14 February 2016.
Lawrence Delevingne (6 April 2015). "Can these young financiers change the world?". Cnbc.com. Retrieved 14 February 2016.

Jump up to:a b c "Managing Risk for JPMorgan, and Blindness".

"The Forum of Young Global Leaders | World Economic Forum". Weforum.org. Retrieved 14 February 2016.

Wharton / NMIMS – Grad and World's First Visually Impaired Trader Ashish Goyal to receive Presidents Award – Archived from the original on 4 December 2010. Retrieved 21 December 2010.

"Metro Blind Sport opening doors to sport". Metroblindsport.org. Retrieved 14 February 2016.

Averil Nunes (19 April 2015). "No sight, but a lot of vision: Ashish Goyal, first visually challenged trader on Wall Street | Latest News & Updates at Daily News & Analysis". Dnaindia.com. Retrieved 14 February 2016.

Ministry of Social Justice and Empowerment – Government of India

References

Indian blind people
Indian bankers
Living people
Wharton School of the University of Pennsylvania alumni
Year of birth missing (living people)